Dougal Jocelyn Goodman  is a British scientist, and was Chief Executive of the Foundation for Science and Technology during 2000–2018.

Goodman studied at Christ's College, Cambridge and researched the mechanical properties of ice at the Cavendish Laboratory, Cambridge under Professor David Tabor.  In 1980 he worked for BP managing a research programme on the effects of ice forces on offshore structures, later becoming head of safety for the company. From 1995 to 2000 he was a Deputy Director of the British Antarctic Survey responsible for the science undertaken by the UK Antarctic Programme, and was awarded the Polar Medal.  His interests are polar history and development of arctic areas as well as walking from Coulags Croft in Coulags in the highlands of Scotland.

He was appointed Officer of the Order of the British Empire (OBE) in the 2012 Birthday Honours for services to science.

Footnotes

References
 Profile at DEFRA retrieved 14 May 2008
 "Dr Dougal Goodman – Cold Calling", The Engineer, 28 November 2005.

Year of birth missing (living people)
Living people
Alumni of Christ's College, Cambridge
British scientists
BP people
Officers of the Order of the British Empire
Recipients of the Polar Medal